Charles de Lorme, Delorme, d'lorm, or De l'Orme (1584 – 24 June 1678), was a French medical doctor who practiced in several regions across Europe during the 17th century. Charles was the son of Jean Delorme (a professor at Montpellier University), who was the primary doctor to Marie de' Medici. This ultimately opened doors for Charles' medical career soon after he graduated from the University of Montpellier in 1607 at the age of 23. He first came to Paris after graduation to practice medicine under the watchful eye of his father, until he was ready to practice as a regular doctor on his own. There are no records of his marriages, except that he married for the third time at the age of 78. This wife died within a year.

Charles was the personal physician to several members of the royal family of the House of Medici from 1610 to 1650. He was the main doctor to Louis the Just after his father retired and additionally became the primary physician to the king's brother Gaston, Duke of Orléans starting in 1629.

Charles was the chief physician of three French kings, Henri IV, Louis XIII and Louis XIV. He was very reputable in his profession as a doctor. He acquired the friendship of Cardinal Richelieu and Chancellor Pierre Séguier, who granted him a pension.

Biography 
One biography describes him as having nice features including a good complexion, and a strong distinct voice. He also had an excellent volubility of language, elegant ease of speech, and a good memory. He was generally open-minded, had a great wit, and spoke with authority. Charles claims he was a direct descendant of Jacques de L'Orme, one of those who worked on the reform of the Custom of Bourbonnais.

Through his father's influence, a professor at the University of Montpellier, he learned Latin, Greek, Spanish and Italian. He also influenced Charles' education in the medical field. Charles did nine theses while he was a student at the University of Montpellier. They were in Latin and Greek and were published and sold in Paris in 1608.

The following are some of these theses.
  Convient-il d'employer les mêmes remèdes avec les amants qu'avec les déments?
 Should one use the same remedies for lovers as are used for the insane?
  Une fièvre pestilente peut-elle être intermittente?
 Can pestilential fever be intermittent?
 La guimauve est-elle un être vivant, et a-t-elle les propriétés que lui accordent Dioscoride et Galien ? 
 Is the althaea officinalis a living being, and does it have the properties which Pedanius Dioscorides and Galen ascribe to it?

The following were four theses, dedicated to the Chancellor de Sillery, that Charles wrote after October 30, 1607.
  La vie des rois, des princes et des grands est-elle moins exposée à la maladie et plus longue que telle des gens du peuple et des paysans?
 Are the lives of kings, princes and great men less exposed to disease and longer than common people and peasants?
  Les vésicants sont-ils bons pour les douleurs arthritiques?
 Are blister-causing agents good for arthritis pain?
 Peut-on préparer un poison qui tue à une époque déterminée?
 Can one prepare a poison that kills at a certain time?
 Est-il permis, quand une femme enceinte souffre d'une maladie aiguë, de lui prescrire des abortifs?
 Is it permissible, when a pregnant woman suffers from an acute illness, to prescribe her an abortion?

De Lorme is credited with the invention of the medico della peste costume worn by plague doctors in Europe's lazarettos in the 17th century.  The costume included a beak filled with perfumes and hat and vestments made of Levantine leather, all intended to prevent a doctor from becoming ill with bubonic plague when visiting sick patients in quarantine.

Mineral baths and spas
Jean de Lorme, Charles' father, was one of two doctors from Moulins that introduced Bourbon-Lancy as a spa town to Europe. Charles was the heir to his father's interest in the spa town, however for some unknown reason promoted the rival spa town of Bourbon-l'Archambault. Charles profited hugely from promoting the spa in this town. He was accused with the proverb d'avoir pris pension des habitants pour y faire aller bien du monde ("to have boarded the inhabitants in order to make the world go well") because of his enthusiasm for this rival spa. Charles gave the spa of Bourbon-l'Archambault its excellent reputation in the European upper class.

Antimony 
Charles became wealthy in a medical practice of prescribing a concoction of antimony to Henry IV, Louis XIII, Cardinal Mazarin, and Madame de Sévigné as a health-preserving, health-restoring and life extending preparation. This concept was originally started by Basil Valentine in his work Currus Triumphalis Antimonii ("The triumphal chariot of antimony"); who obtained the idea of medical benefits from Paracelsus (1480–1541). Charles claimed "qui plus en boira, plus il vivra" (He who drinks more will live more). Some of the patients to whom he prescribed this concoction were Guez de Balzac, who lived to the age of 70, Nicolas Boileau-Despréaux, who lived to the age of 75, and Daniel Huet, who lived to the age of 91. Charles himself lived to the age of 94.

Footnotes

Sources 
 Astruc, Jean, Mémoires pour servir à l'histoire de la Faculté de médecine de Montpellier, P.G. Cavelier, 1767
 Bernardin,  Maurice Napoleon, Men and manners (French), 1900
 Sneader, Walter, Drug discovery: a history, John Wiley and Sons, 2005, 
 Thomas, Joseph, Universal Pronouncing Dictionary of Biography and Mythology, Volume 1,
 Tibayrenc, Michel, Encyclopedia of infectious diseases: Modern methodologies, Wiley-Liss, 2007, 

16th-century French physicians
17th-century French physicians
People from Moulins, Allier
1584 births
1678 deaths